Platform Security Architecture (PSA) Certified is a security certification scheme for Internet of Things (IoT) hardware, software and devices. It was created by Arm Holdings, Brightsight, CAICT, Prove & Run, Riscure, TrustCB and UL as part of a global partnership.

Arm Holdings first brought forward the PSA specifications in 2017 to outline common standards for IoT security with PSA Certified assurance scheme launching two years later in 2019.

History
In 2017, Arm Holdings created Platform Security Architecture (PSA), a standard for IoT security. The standard builds trust between Internet of Things services and devices. It was built to include an array of specifications such as threat models, security analyses, hardware and firmware architecture specifications, and an open-source firmware reference implementation. It aimed to become an industry-wide security component, with built-in security functions for both software and device manufacturers.

PSA has since evolved to become PSA Certified, a four-stage framework which can be used by IoT designers for security practices. The framework included different levels of trust, with each level contains a different level of assessment, with progressively increasing security assurances.

In 2018, the first IoT threat models and PSA documents were published.

The certification of PSA Certified launched at Embedded World in 2019, where Level 1 Certification was presented to chip vendors. A draft of Level 2 protection was presented at the same time.

Six of the seven founding stakeholders created the PSA Certified specifications, which are now make up the PSA Joint Stakeholders Agreement. The stakeholders are Arm Holdings, Brightsight, CAICT, Prove & Run, Riscure and UL. TrustCB became the seventh PSA Certified JSA member, acting as an independent Certification Body for the scheme. Out of the six other founding members, four are security test laboratories, which includes Brightsight, CAICT, Riscure and UL. 

Security test labs Applus+ and ECSEC joined PSA Certified in 2021. 

The first PSA Certified Level 2 certificates were issued to chip vendors in February 2020.

The first PSA Certified Level 3 certificate was issue in March 2021.

PSA Certified Level 2 + Secure Element was introduced in November 2022, which allows a secure element to be used to provides moderate physical protections to Level 2 without requiring the advanced protections of Level 3.

Certification
The PSA Joint Stakeholders Agreement outlines how members can create a worldwide standard for IoT security that enables the electronic industry to have an easy to understand security scheme. The security certification scheme documents enable a security-by-design approach to a diverse set of IoT products. The scheme starts with a security assessment of the chip and its Root of Trust (RoT) and then builds outwards to the system software and device application code. PSA Certified specifications are implementation and architecture agnostic so can be applied to any chip, software or device.

PSA Certified aims to removes industry fragmentation for IoT product manufacturers and developers in a number of ways. The world's leading IoT chip vendors are delivering system-on-chips built with a PSA Root of Trust (PSA-RoT) providing a new widely available security component with built-in security functions that software platforms and original device manufacturers (OEMs) can make use of.

Functional API certification

A high-level set of APIs are provided by the PSA-RoT to abstract the trusted hardware and firmware used by different chip vendors. These APIs include:
 PSA Cryptography API
 PSA Attestation API 
 PSA Storage API
 PSA Firmware Update API

Open source API test suites are available to check compliance for PSA Functional API Certification. An open-source implementation of the PSA Root of Trust APIs is provided by the TrustedFirmware.org project.

Level 1
The first level of security certification for PSA Certified is Level 1, aimed at chip vendors, software platforms and device manufacturers. The certification consists of questions, document review and an interview by one of the certification labs. The completed answers are accompanied with explanatory notes, checked by the certification lab. According to the PSA Certified website, language and mappings align with other important IoT requirements, such as standards and laws. These include NISTIR 8259, ETSI 303 645 and SB-327.

Level 2
The mid-level security certification involves testing by a security lab, focusing on software attacks, and provides a review of the PSA Root of Trust (PSA-RoT) source code over the course of a month to attain the level 2 certification. This process focuses on carefully defined attack methods and utilizes a set evaluation methodology. It also ensures hardware must support PSA-RoT functions and is therefore aimed at chip vendors.

According to Forbes, they believed Level 2 was likely to become the most common level for consumer IoT applications.

Level 2 + Secure Element
This level extends the criteria of Level 2 to provide physical protection of a subset of security functions, such as secure cryptographic operations and secure key storage. A typical instantiation would be a Level 2 Certified SoC with a secure element.

Level 3
The final level extends the criteria of Level 2 to include protection against various physical attacks and side-channel attacks. Unlike Level 2 + Secure Element, the scope includes physical protection of all security functions.

Industry adoption
Since the launch of the standard, it has been adopted by a number of chip manufacturers and system software providers.

References

Internet of things companies
Internet security